The S3 district lies within in the City of Sheffield, South Yorkshire, England.  The district contains 101 listed buildings that are recorded in the National Heritage List for England.  Of these, seven are listed at Grade II*, the middle grade, and the others are at Grade II, the lowest grade.  The district is lies north and west of central Sheffield, and includes the areas of Broomhall, Burngreave, Kelham Island, Neepsend, Netherthorpe, and the markets area of Sheffield City Centre.

For neighbouring areas, see listed buildings in Sheffield City Centre, listed buildings in S4, listed buildings in S5, listed buildings in S6 and listed buildings in S10.



Key

Buildings

References 

 - A list of all the listed buildings within Sheffield City Council's boundary is available to download from this page.

Sources

 
Sheffield